Timothy Roger Sale (May 1, 1956 – June 16, 2022) was an American Eisner Award-winning comics artist, "best known for his work on the DC Comics characters Batman and Superman and for influencing depictions of the Caped Crusader in numerous films." He is primarily known for his collaborations with writer Jeph Loeb, which included both comics work, and artwork for the TV series Heroes. Sale's renditions of Batman influenced modern cinematic depictions of the character, with film directors and actors directly citing Sale's work.

Early life
Tim Sale was born on May 1, 1956, in Ithaca, New York, the son of Dorothy Young, a feminist political activist, and Roger Sale, a literary critic.

He spent most of his early life in Seattle, Washington, having moved there with his family at age six. He attended the University of Washington for two years before moving to New York City to attend the School of Visual Arts, as well as the comics workshop run by artist John Buscema. Mr. Sale completed the "John Buscema Art School, which was advertised in the pages of Marvel Comics and held in a New York City hotel for a short time in the 1970s."

He returned to Seattle before graduating from SVA.

Career

Sale began doing art for the series MythAdventures in 1983, and was soon working on Thieves' World.

The body of Sale's comics work has been with collaborator Jeph Loeb. The duo, credited in their comics as 'storytellers', produced popular work such as the "Year 1"-centered Batman: Legends of the Dark Knight Halloween Specials, Batman: The Long Halloween, Batman: Dark Victory, as well as Superman for All Seasons and Catwoman: When in Rome. At Marvel Comics, the team has produced the so-called "color" books such as Daredevil: Yellow, Spider-Man: Blue, and Hulk: Gray. A Captain America: White limited series was announced in 2008 but only a #0 issue was published. The long-delayed project finally saw print in September 2015.

With Darwyn Cooke, Sale launched the Superman Confidential series in 2007.

Sale worked on artwork for the television program Heroes, where his frequent collaborator Jeph Loeb served as a writer and producer. Sale's artwork appeared in the show as the work of the precognitive artist Isaac Mendez as well as other artists on the show. Eric Powell was hired as the colorist for Sale's work. Sale also created the font used in the show's captions and credits, which he based on his handwriting.

In 2021, The Long Halloween was adapted for a two-part animated film from Warner Bros. Home Entertainment.

Awards
Sale won an Eisner Award in 1999 in the "Best Artist/Penciller/Inker or Penciller/Inker Team" category.

Personal life and death
Sale lived in the Seattle metropolitan area. On June 13, 2022, Jim Lee announced Sale had been admitted to the hospital with severe health issues. Representatives of Sale later confirmed he was in the hospital while asking for privacy. Three days later, Sale died on June 16, from kidney failure. "He is survived by his mother; his sister, Maggie Sale; and his partner, Susan Bailey."

Legacy
DC Comics publisher Jim Lee praised Sale, saying, "Tim Sale was an amazing artist, draftsman and storyteller. Beyond the taut chiaroscuro style which became his trademark. Tim clearly put a premium on storytelling, clarity and pacing — cherishing emotion above all. His stories were beautifully visceral, nuanced and evinced deep humanity. Tim simply had no use for surface banality."

Filmmakers Christopher Nolan and Matt Reeves, both of whom directed Batman films, have cited Batman: The Long Halloween and its sequel, Batman: Dark Victory, as an influence on those films. In an interview with the website World of Batman, Christian Bale, who played the character, characterized the "really fantastic imagery" with which Sale rendered those works. Commenting on Sale's figurework, Bale stated, "I would kind of imitate those positions."

Bibliography

Selected works

 Billi 99 (with Sarah Byam)
 Grendel (with Matt Wagner)
 Deathblow (with Jim Lee and Brandon Choi)
 Superman Confidential [aka "Superman: Kryptonite"] (with Darwyn Cooke)
 Tim Sale: Black And White hardcover (Active Images, 2004); Revised and Expanded Edition (Image Comics, 2008). An art and career retrospective of Tim Sale. By Richard Starkings and John "JG" Roshell with Tim Sale.

With Jeph Loeb
 Challengers of the Unknown Must Die! collects Challengers of the Unknown vol. 2 #1–8 (March–Oct. 1991), DC Comics, trade paperback 224 pages, October 2004, 
 Batman: Haunted Knight collects Batman: Legends of the Dark Knight Halloween Special #1 (Dec. 1993), Batman: Madness A Legends of the Dark Knight Halloween Special #1 (1994), and Batman: Ghosts Legends of the Dark Knight Halloween Special #1 (1995), DC Comics, trade paperback 192 pages, September 1996, 
 Wolverine & Gambit: Victims collects Wolverine/Gambit: Victims #1–4 (Sept.–Dec. 1995), Marvel Comics, hardcover 112 pages, November 2009, ; trade paperback March 2013,  
 Batman: The Long Halloween collects Batman: The Long Halloween #1–13 (Dec. 1996–Dec. 1997), DC Comics, hardcover 369 pages, February 1999, ; trade paperback October 2011, 
 Superman For All Seasons collects Superman For All Seasons #1–4 (Sept.–Dec. 1998), DC Comics, hardcover 208 pages, October 1999, ; trade paperback October 2002, 
 Batman: Dark Victory collects Batman: Dark Victory #1–13 (Dec. 1999–Dec. 2000), DC Comics, hardcover 408 pages, May 2012, ; trade paperback 392 pages, October 2002, 
 Daredevil: Yellow collects Daredevil: Yellow #1–6 (Aug. 2001–Jan. 2002), Marvel Comics, hardcover 160 pages, July 2002, ; trade paperback July 2011,  
 Spider-Man: Blue collects Spider-Man: Blue #1–6 (July 2002 – April 2003), Marvel Comics, hardcover 160 pages, May 2003, ; trade paperback August 2011,   
 Hulk: Gray collects Hulk: Gray #1–6 (Dec. 2003 – April 2004), Marvel Comics, trade paperback 168 pages, June 2011, 
 Catwoman: When in Rome collects Catwoman: When in Rome #1–6 (Nov. 2004–Aug. 2005), DC Comics, hardcover 160 pages, December 2005, ; trade paperback June 2007, 
 Solo #1 (Dec. 2004) with Jeph Loeb, Brian Azzarello, Darwyn Cooke, and Diana Schutz, DC Comics
 Captain America: White #0–5 (Sept. 2008–Dec. 2015), Marvel Comics

Short stories
 Grendel: Black, White & Red #1 (Dark Horse Comics, 1998). Eight-page short story with writer Matt Wagner.
 Robert E. Howard's Myth Maker (1999). One-shot drawn by several pencillers such as John Bolton (also cover artist of the issue), Richard Corben or Kelley Jones. Tim Sale drew several pages, with script by Roy Thomas.
 Vampirella: Rebirth #1 (Harris Comics, 1999). Eight-page short story with writer Jeph Loeb, and variant cover.
 9-11: The World's Finest Comic Book Writers & Artists Tell Stories to Remember, Volume Two (DC Comics). One-page short story from an idea by Chuck Kim.
 Buffy the Vampire Slayer: Tales of the Slayers TPB (Dark Horse Comics, February 2002). Cover and short story (12 pages) written by Joss Whedon, about a female medieval vampire hunter.
 JSA: All Stars #2 (DC Comics, 2003). Six-page back up story about the Golden Age Hawkman and Hawkgirl, with writer Jeph Loeb.
 Tales of The Batman: Tim Sale collection of Batman tales drawn by Tim Sale in his career with writers Darwyn Cooke, Alan Grant, James Robinson, and Kelley Puckett, 240 pages, January 2009,

Cover work
 The Foot Soldiers #3 (Dark Horse Comics, 1996)
 Adventures of Superman #597, Batgirl #21, Detective Comics #763, Harley Quinn #13, JSA #29 and The Spectre #10 (DC Comics, December 2001). All the issues were part of the "Last Laugh" crossover.
 Flinch #5 (DC Comics/Vertigo, 1999)
 El Diablo #1–4 (DC Comics/Vertigo, 2001)
 Queen & Country #1–4 (Oni Press, 2001)
 Detective Comics #777–796 (DC Comics, February 2003 – September 2004)
 Batgirl #69–73 (DC Comics)
 Batman (vol. 3) #1–5, 17, 21–23, 29–30, 38, 54 (DC Comics)

References

External links

Tim Sale at Mike's Amazing World of Comics
Tim Sale at the Unofficial Handbook of Marvel Comics Creators
Tim Sale Interview at Batman-on-Film.com
Sale's KCRW Guest DJ Set
 
 

1956 births
2022 deaths
20th-century American artists
21st-century American artists
American comics artists
Artists from Ithaca, New York
DC Comics people
Eisner Award winners for Best Penciller/Inker or Penciller/Inker Team
Marvel Comics people
School of Visual Arts alumni
University of Washington alumni
Deaths from kidney failure